John Hahn may refer to:
 John Hahn (politician), member of the U.S. House of Representatives from Pennsylvania
 John Hahn (golfer), American golfer
 John David Hahn, German educator